Batman: The Long Halloween is a 13-issue American comic book limited series written by Jeph Loeb with art by Tim Sale. It was originally published by DC Comics in 1996 and 1997. It was the follow-up to three Batman: Legends of the Dark Knight Halloween Specials (which were reprinted in Batman: Haunted Knight) by the same creative team. The series' success led to Loeb and Sale to reteam for two sequels, Batman: Dark Victory and Catwoman: When in Rome, which are set concurrently.

Taking place during Batman's early days of crime fighting, The Long Halloween tells the story of a mysterious killer named Holiday, who murders people on holidays, one each month. Working with District Attorney Harvey Dent and Captain James Gordon, Batman races against the calendar as he tries to discover who Holiday is before he claims his next victim each month, while attempting to stop the crime war between two of Gotham City's most powerful families, Maroni and Falcone. This novel also acted as a re-introduction to the DC Universe for one of Batman's most elusive foes, Calendar Man, who knows the true identity of the Holiday killer but refuses to share this with Batman. He instead riddles and gives Batman hints from his Arkham Asylum cell. The story also ties into the events that transform Harvey Dent into Batman's enemy, Two-Face. Enemies such as Scarecrow, the Joker, Mad Hatter, Poison Ivy, and the Riddler, among others, also make appearances.

In continuity terms, The Long Halloween continues the story of Batman: Year One for the characters of Batman, Gordon, Catwoman, and Falcone, and is considered to replace the earlier effort Batman: Year Two in the character's continuity. It also revolves around the transition of Batman's rogues gallery from plainclothes, real-world style mobsters to full-fledged supervillains and tells the origin of Two-Face, incorporating elements of the story in Batman: Annual #14.

Background
The project was sparked when group editor Archie Goodwin approached Jeph Loeb and Tim Sale at the San Diego Comic Convention and asked if the two of them wanted to do more Batman work.

Jeph Loeb has stated that the genesis of the story was influenced by writer Mark Waid, who, when told that Loeb was working on a story set in the Year One continuity, suggested focusing on Harvey Dent's years prior to becoming Two-Face, as that had not been depicted in depth since the original Year One story.

Plot
At a wedding in June, Gotham City mob boss Carmine "The Roman" Falcone tries to pressure Bruce Wayne to help launder his money, but Bruce refuses. Later, Bruce (as Batman) returns to investigate Falcone's penthouse but finds Catwoman similarly engaged. Batman meets with district attorney Harvey Dent and police captain Jim Gordon. The three agree to a pact to end Falcone's crime reign, bending but never breaking the law to achieve it.

Bruce, on the board of the Gotham City Bank, uses his sway and influence as Batman to oust the current president Richard Daniel and take over to rid the bank of its Falcone money. Under orders from his uncle, Falcone's nephew, Johnny Viti, assassinates Daniel. Viti himself is killed on Halloween by an unknown assailant, leaving behind an untraceable pistol, a nipple from a baby bottle used as a crude silencer, and a jack-o-lantern. Catwoman leads Batman to a warehouse where Falcone has been forced to stash his funds. Batman and Dent set the warehouse on fire to destroy the money. Falcone responds by hiring a gang of Irish hitmen to destroy Dent's home with a bomb, but he and his wife Gilda survive. On Thanksgiving, the hitmen themselves are killed by an unknown agent who leaves the same type of pistol and silencer behind, along with a Thanksgiving decoration. Milos Grappa, Falcone's bodyguard, is killed similarly on Christmas. The unknown assailant is given the name "Holiday" and is believed to be a Falcone rival.

On New Year's Eve, Batman stops the Joker from using deadly laughing gas to kill everyone in Gotham Square. Meanwhile, Dent's corrupt assistant, Vernon Fields, finds evidence supposedly linking Falcone to Wayne. Aboard the Falcone yacht, Falcone's son, Alberto, is killed by Holiday on New Year's Eve. Over the next few months, Holiday's targets change to that of the Maronis, a rival crime gang in Gotham. A war between the Falcones and Maronis breaks out, and Falcone is forced to turn to enlist Gotham's "freaks" (such as the Riddler, Poison Ivy, the Scarecrow, and Mad Hatter) to hold his ground. Per Falcone's instructions, Poison Ivy ensnares Bruce Wayne on Valentine's Day, coercing him into laundering money for Falcone. This unintentionally takes Batman out of the equation. It is not until Saint Patrick's Day that Selina Kyle figures out what has happened to him and, as Catwoman, frees him from Poison Ivy's clutches. The Riddler becomes the first target to be spared by Holiday on April Fool's Day, which Batman comes to suspect as being a message from Holiday to Falcone.

Meanwhile, the pistols left behind by Holiday and the bullets gleaned from Holiday's victims are traced to a Chinatown neighborhood, but the gunmaker is found dead as Holiday's victim on Mother's Day. On the following day, Dent follows up on Vernon's investigation and has Bruce arrested, claiming that as Bruce's father Thomas Wayne saved Falcone's life after he was shot, that Bruce is loyal to the Falcones. However, Bruce's butler, Alfred, testifies that Thomas Wayne's report never came to light due to police corruption, which helps declare Bruce innocent, especially in light of the murder of the Gotham City coroner on Independence Day.

Sal Maroni, having been arrested earlier, offers to testify against Falcone after his father is killed on Father's Day. During the trial, he throws a vial of acid—secretly given to him earlier by Vernon—at Dent, disfiguring half of Dent's face. Dent is rushed to a hospital but escapes into the sewers, befriending Solomon Grundy when he encounters him. Gordon deduces Dent may be Holiday, but Batman refuses to believe it until he can talk to Dent himself.

After Falcone's sister, Carla Viti, is murdered on Falcone's birthday in August, Batman questions Julian Gregory Day, the Calendar Man, on where to find Dent. Day suggests that, since it is Labor Day, Holiday will try to kill Maroni. Batman stages a plan with Gordon to move Maroni, giving Holiday the means and opportunity. During the transfer, Holiday murders Maroni, but Batman – having disguised himself as one of the security guards – takes him down. Holiday is revealed to be Alberto Falcone, son of Carmine Falcone, who had faked his death.

On Halloween, Dent resurfaces as Two-Face. He releases most of the super-criminals from Arkham Asylum, then seeks out and kills both Carmine Falcone and Vernon, despite Batman's attempts to stop him. Falcone's daughter, Sofia, is also apparently killed in a struggle with Catwoman.

His revenge complete, Two-Face turns himself into Gordon and Batman but tells them that there were two Holiday killers. Gordon is confused, as Alberto has already confessed to all of the killings. While Batman initially dismisses Two-Face's statement, he points out the fact that Two-Face, having killed Falcone and the last of his collaborators on Halloween, could technically be considered Holiday. While Two-Face is imprisoned at Arkham along with the recaptured criminals, Alberto can delay his execution based on insanity.

Months later, on Christmas Eve, Gilda is packing boxes to leave Gotham but takes one box to her furnace, containing a pistol, a hat, and what appears to be her husband's clothing. As she burns the items, she thinks about how she took it upon herself to start the Holiday killings to try to end Falcone's hold on Gotham and reduce her husband's workload so that they would have time together. She has the wild suspicion that Alberto was lying, instead choosing to believe that Dent himself had taken up the killings on New Year's Eve and that the two were finally working together by sharing secrets. Nevertheless, she is content with Alberto as their scapegoat, knowing the authorities are incapable of finding the other Holiday killer without Dent on their side and states that she still believes her husband can be cured.

Collected editions
The entire series has been collected in trade paperbacks, a hardcover, an absolute edition, a noir edition, and a deluxe edition:
Trade paperback, DC Comics, 1998.
Hardcover, DC Comics, 1999.
Trade paperback, Titan Books, 1999.
Absolute Edition, hardcover, DC Comics, 2007.
New trade paperback, DC Comics, 2011.
Noir Edition, hardcover, DC Comics, 2014.
Deluxe Edition, hardcover, DC Comics, 2021.
The Batman Box Set was released in March 2022, collecting trade paperbacks of The Long Halloween, Year One, and Ego and Other Tails in a slipcase with art by Jim Lee. Director Matt Reeves cited the three graphic novels as the major influences for The Batman.

Critical reaction
Batman: The Long Halloween has received widespread critical acclaim and is praised as one of the definitive Batman stories to date due to Jeph Loeb's involving storyline and Tim Sale's dark, moody art.

Hilary Goldstein of IGN Comics praised Loeb's story as "tight, engrossing, and intelligent writing that never betrays the characters", adding that he "mixes Batman and Bruce Wayne's lives as well as anyone has, and brilliantly demonstrates the bond of brotherhood shared by Batman, Jim Gordon and then District Attorney Harvey Dent." Goldstein later ranked The Long Halloween #4 on a list of the 25 best Batman graphic novels.

Yannick Belzil of The 11th Hour said that "Jeph Loeb has crafted a story that is unique to the characters. It's a complex murder mystery, but it's also a Batman story." Belzil added: "Buoyed by a film noir-ish plot that features a Gothic twist on the gangster/murder mystery plot, terrific character-based subplots, and beautiful, cinematic art, [The Long Halloween is] an addition to your collection that you won't regret."

In other media

Television
 The fourth season of Gotham adapted some elements of The Long Halloween storyline.
 The New Batman Adventures episode "Mean Seasons" has adapted some elements of The Long Halloween storyline, most notably the antagonist committing crimes every holiday.

Films
 The Long Halloween was one of the comics that influenced Christopher Nolan's Batman trilogy, particularly The Dark Knight (2008), which featured Harvey Dent's transformation into Two-Face. Dent forms a pact with Gordon and Batman to bring down the mobs that have taken the place of Carmine Falcone's crime family. Both stories involve the mob laundering their money into the Gotham banks and the three protagonists are trying to prevent it. The scene where the Joker sets fire to the mob's money is similar to the scene where Batman and Dent burn Falcone's stashed money at the docks. Similar to the repercussions to the Joker's killing spree, Batman sidetracks his work against the mob and focuses on catching the Holiday killer. Gordon's plan to disguise himself as a S.W.A.T officer during Dent's transportation to the county jail is similar to Batman's plan to lure out Holiday during Sal Maroni's transfer. Dent transforms into Two-Face, he becomes disillusioned with the law and decides to take matters into his own hands by murdering Sal Maroni. He also gets his revenge on the corrupt associates who were involved in the attack that led to his disfigurement by deciding their fate with a flip of his coin. A quote from the graphic novel, "I believe in Harvey Dent", is used as Dent's campaign slogan in the film.
 A direct-to-video film adaptation of the comic was released as part of the DC Universe Animated Original Movies line. It is a two-part film similar to Batman: The Dark Knight Returns, The Death of Superman and Reign of the Supermen, but is a stand-alone film separate from the DC Animated Movie Universe. It stars the voice talents of Jensen Ackles as Batman/Bruce Wayne, Josh Duhamel as Harvey Dent, Billy Burke as James Gordon, Titus Welliver as Carmine Falcone, David Dastmalchian as Calendar Man, Troy Baker as Joker, Amy Landecker as Barbara Gordon, Julie Nathanson as Gilda Dent, Jack Quaid as Alberto, Fred Tatasciore as Solomon Grundy, Jim Pirri as Sal Maroni, Alastair Duncan as Alfred and Naya Rivera in her final film role as Catwoman. Both parts were released in 2021: Part One on June 22 and Part Two on July 27. The combined version of the film is scheduled for release in 2022.
The Long Halloween serves as one of the primary inspirations for the story of The Batman (2022), directed by Matt Reeves. The film similarly depicts a more inexperienced version of the titular character in his second year of crimefighting, as well as illustrates the gradual transition of some supporting characters in Gotham City such as Selina Kyle/Catwoman and Oswald Cobblepot/Penguin from more grounded individuals into the fully formed characters they come to be in the comic books. It also shares a similar tone influenced by noir film and detective stories, as well as introducing Batman as closely cooperating with the Gotham City Police Department and having a strong relationship with James Gordon prior to his becoming Commissioner. The film also features minor subplots of Selina Kyle taking interest in Carmine Falcone due in part to his knowledge of her parentage and the question of the Wayne family's honor having ties to the Falcones and doing business with them.

Video games
 The 2011 video game Batman: Arkham City has an unlockable skin for Catwoman based on her appearance in The Long Halloween.
 For the 2013 video game Batman: Arkham Origins, a pre-order bonus pack contained an optional suit for Batman based on his appearance in The Long Halloween.
 In Batman: Arkham Knight, upon finding the third victim in the "Perfect Crime" side mission, Alfred will tell Batman that the events of this mission resemble a serial killing case he conducted early in his career as the caped vigilante that coincidentally also occurred on Halloween, recalling that it was "a long one". This is a reference to The Long Halloween, more specifically the events of the Holiday killings. The "Flip of a Coin" story pack also includes references to the comic, such as a gun with a baby bottle nipple in a display case at Two-Face's office.

References

1996 comics debuts
DC Comics adapted into films
Eisner Award winners for Best Limited Series
Neo-noir comics